2021 Scottish League Cup final may refer to:

2021 Scottish League Cup final (February) (St Johnstone 1–0 Livingston)
2021 Scottish League Cup final (December) (Celtic 2–1 Hibernian)